Barkley Township is one of thirteen townships in Jasper County, Indiana, United States. As of the 2010 census, its population was 900 and it contained 362 housing units.

History
Barkley Township was established in 1838. It was named for Henry Barkley, Sr.

Geography

Unincorporated towns
 Gifford
 Newland

Extinct towns
 Lewiston
 Moody

Adjacent townships
 Walker Township (north)
 Gillam Township (east)
 Hanging Grove Township (southeast)
 Marion Township (southwest)
 Union Township (west)

Cemeteries
The township contains nine cemeteries: Brown, Dunkard, Hankle, Parkison, Prater, Price, Rees, Sandridge and Smith.

Major highways
  Indiana State Road 14
  Indiana State Road 49

Education
Barkley Township residents may request a free library card from the Jasper County Public Library.

References
 
 United States Census Bureau cartographic boundary files

External links
 Indiana Township Association
 United Township Association of Indiana

Townships in Jasper County, Indiana
Townships in Indiana